Stanislav Polčák (born 21 February 1980) is a Czech lawyer and politician who was elected as a Member of the European Parliament in 2019.

On 20 June 2022 Polčák has suspended his membership in the Mayors and Independents party in connection with his ties with businessman and lobbyist .

References

MEPs for the Czech Republic 2014–2019
MEPs for the Czech Republic 2019–2024
Mayors and Independents MEPs
1980 births
Living people
People from Slavičín
21st-century Czech lawyers
Charles University alumni
Members of the Chamber of Deputies of the Czech Republic (2010–2013)
Members of the Chamber of Deputies of the Czech Republic (2013–2017)